Lake Effect is a literary journal based at the Erie campus of Penn State University. It was first published in 1996. In Spring 2022, the 26th volume of the journal was released.

Editors
The current editors are George Looney (editor-in-chief) and Aimee Pogson (fiction).

It is notable among University-sponsored literary journals in that its editorial staff are undergraduate students. Most other University-sponsored literary journals have MFA students who are involved in the editorial work.

Contributors
Recent noteworthy contributors include:  Steve Almond, Jacob M. Appel, T. R. Hummer, Michael Martone, Chris Mazza, Esther Pearlman and Virgil Suarez.

Other Awards
Stories that have previously appeared in Lake Effect have been anthologized in the Best American Short Stories.  [citation and title / author needed]

See also
List of literary magazines

References

External links
 Lake Effect

1996 establishments in Pennsylvania
Annual magazines published in the United States
Literary magazines published in the United States
Student magazines published in the United States
Magazines established in 1996
magazines published in Pennsylvania
Pennsylvania State University